When William Came: A Story of London Under the Hohenzollerns is a novel written by the British author Saki (the pseudonym of Hector Hugh Munro) and published in November 1913. It is set several years in what was then the future, after a war between Germany and Great Britain in which the former won.

Plot
The "William" of the book's title is German Emperor Kaiser Wilhelm II. The book chronicles life in London under German occupation and the changes that come with a foreign army's invasion and triumph. Like Robert Erskine Childers's novel The Riddle of the Sands (1903), it predicts the Great War (in which Saki would be killed) and is an example of invasion literature, a literary genre which flourished at the beginning of the 20th century as tensions between the European great powers increased.

Much of the book is an argument for compulsory military service, about which there was then a major controversy. The scene in which an Imperial Rescript is announced in a subjugated London, excusing the unmilitary British from serving in the Kaiser's armies, is particularly bitter. There are also several vignettes exemplifying the differences between the English and continental systems of law – Yeovil's wife informs him that she must register his presence with the police and later he is fined on the spot for walking on the grass in Hyde Park. In another episode, he finds himself unintentionally but unavoidably fraternising with one of the invaders.

Anthologies
It has been collected in:
England Invaded (1977)
It has been reprinted with

See also
Invasion literature

References

External links
The full text of When William Came at Project Gutenberg.
 
 

1913 British novels
Novels by Saki
1913 speculative fiction novels
Novels set in London
Fictional invasions of England